The Third National Bank, also known as the Community Chest Building, is located on James Street in Syracuse, New York.  It was designed by architect Archimedes Russell in 1885.  It is significant for its architecture and for its role in commerce in Syracuse in the late eighteenth century.  It was added to the National Register of Historic Places in 1972.

See also
Yule marble

References

External links

Bank buildings on the National Register of Historic Places in New York (state)
Queen Anne architecture in New York (state)
Commercial buildings completed in 1885
Buildings and structures in Syracuse, New York
National Register of Historic Places in Syracuse, New York